Lara Hoffmann (born 25 March 1991) is a German sprinter. She competed in the 4 x 400 metres relay at the 2016 Summer Olympics. The team finished 5th in their heat and did not advance to the final.

References 

1991 births
Living people
German female sprinters
Athletes (track and field) at the 2016 Summer Olympics
Olympic athletes of Germany
Olympic female sprinters
21st-century German women